Stefan Reichmuth (born 20 September 1994) is a Swiss freestyle wrestler. He won one of the bronze medals in the men's 86 kg event at the 2019 World Wrestling Championships held in Nur-Sultan, Kazakhstan. As a result, he became the first Swiss competitor to win a medal at the World Wrestling Championships.

He represented Switzerland at the 2020 Summer Olympics held in Tokyo, Japan. He competed in the men's 86 kg event.

Career 

In 2015, he represented Switzerland at the European Games in the men's freestyle 74 kg event without winning a medal. In the same year, he also competed in the men's freestyle 74 kg event at the 2015 World Wrestling Championships held in Las Vegas, United States without winning a medal. He was eliminated in his first match by Jabrayil Hasanov of Azerbaijan. The following year, he competed at the 2016 European Wrestling Olympic Qualification Tournament hoping to qualify for the 2016 Summer Olympics in Rio de Janeiro, Brazil. He did not advance far as he was eliminated in his first match by Ibragim Aldatov of Ukraine.

Achievements

References

External links 

 

Living people
1994 births
Place of birth missing (living people)
Swiss male sport wrestlers
World Wrestling Championships medalists
Wrestlers at the 2015 European Games
Wrestlers at the 2019 European Games
European Games competitors for Switzerland
Wrestlers at the 2020 Summer Olympics
Olympic wrestlers of Switzerland
21st-century Swiss people